Markku Aulis Taskinen (born 25 February 1952) is a Finnish former athlete. At the 1974 European Championships he won bronze medals in both the 800 metres and the 4 × 400 metres relay. He was European indoor champion at 800 metres in 1978.

Career
Taskinen was Finnish national under-19 champion at 800 m in 1970 and national under-21 champion at both 400 m and 800 m in 1971. He won his first national senior titles in 1973, winning both 400 m (47.9) and 800 m (1:50.0) at the Finnish championships. He repeated as 800 m champion in 1974, but was not expected to even make the final at that year's European Championships in Rome.

At the European championships he placed third in his heat (1:48.7) and fourth in his semi-final (1:47.7); he was the last athlete to qualify for the final. In the final he was in last place with less than 100 m to go, but passed five athletes on the final straight and won bronze behind Luciano Sušanj and Steve Ovett; his time of 1:45.89 improved his personal best by more than a second and a half. He won a second medal in the 4 × 400 m relay, running the third leg for the Finnish team; Finland was disqualified for shoving after a French protest, but filed a successful counter-protest and regained the medal.

Taskinen won further Finnish 800 m titles in 1975, 1976 and 1978; counting indoor titles (one each at 400 m and 800 m) and relay titles (one at 4 × 400 m and two at 4 × 800 m), he is an 11-time Finnish champion. At the 1978 European outdoor championships in Prague Taskinen again took part in the 800 metres, but was eliminated in the semi-finals.

In 1979 Taskinen experimented with the 400 m hurdles, representing Finland in that event at the Finland-Sweden Athletics International and winning silver in it at the national championships.

References

1952 births
Living people
People from Kuusamo
Finnish male sprinters
Finnish male middle-distance runners
European Athletics Championships medalists
Sportspeople from North Ostrobothnia